Mirabad is a town in Helmand Province, Afghanistan. It is located at 30°34'0N 63°36'0E and has an altitude of 624 metres (2050 feet).

See also
 Helmand Province

References

Populated places in Helmand Province